Counties of cities are areas combining functions of county and city:
 in England & Wales and Ireland
 county corporate (prior to the creation of county councils in 1889 (England & Wales) 1898)
 county borough (subsequently)
 in Scotland 
 from the Local Government (Scotland) Act 1889 until 1973
 List of local government areas in Scotland 1930–75#Counties of cities

See also
 county town
 City-county (disambiguation)
 City status in the United Kingdom
 Counties of the United Kingdom